Kobi Peretz (born October 28, 1975),  is an Israeli singer who sings in the Mizrahi style.

Biography
Yaakov (Kobi) Peretz was born and raised in Tel Aviv, the youngest of 10 children. He is of Moroccan Jewish descent. He is known for his  hit Balbeli Oto (Confuse Him).
He was sentenced to 18 months in prison for tax evasion on May 16, 2016. He began his term at Maasiyahu Prison on October 15, 2017.

Selected discography 
 You Are Like Fire – 1995
 The Arrow of Love – 1997
 I Live The Way I Want – 2001
 Confuse Him – 2003
 Crazy About You – 2004
 All That's In Me – 2006
 How Much Love – 2008
 Written in the Heavens – 2012

See also
 Mizrahi Music
Israeli music

References

External links
 

1975 births
Living people
20th-century Israeli male singers
Israeli people of Moroccan-Jewish descent
People from Tel Aviv
21st-century Israeli male singers